Orazio Orlando (14 June 1933 – 18 December 1990) was an Italian film, stage and television actor.

Life and career 
Born in Naples, Orlando attended the Academy of Dramatic Arts in Rome for two seasons, in 1953-54 and in 1954-55, without graduating.  He made his debut at 18, with the stage company of Renzo Ricci, along with Giorgio Albertazzi and Anna Proclemer.  His first important participation was in Shakespeare's King Lear, in 1955. 

In 1958 he began his television career in the role of Tybalt in a successful adaptation of Romeo and Juliet; he took part in a great number of films, TV-series and television movies, but became popular in 1973 thanks to the interpretation of the Commissioner Solmi, in the television series Qui squadra mobile. 

He is best remembered for his film roles in Elio Petri's Investigation of a Citizen Above Suspicion (1970) and Property Is No Longer a Theft (1973), Pupi Avati's Help Me Dream (1981) and Alberto Bevilacqua's Woman of Wonders, or La donna delle meraviglie (original title) (1985). 

At 57 years old, he died of a heart attack on the Teatro Flaiano stage in Rome during the rehearsal of the play Ad Eva aggiungi Eva.

Selected filmography 

 Le bambole (1965) - Richetto, amante (segment "Minestra, La")
 Investigation of a Citizen Above Suspicion (1970) - Brigadiere Biglia
 Il debito coniugale (1970) - Romolo
 Waterloo (1970) - Constant
 La supertestimone (1971) - Charlot, il secondino capo
 Ripped Off (1972) - Mike Dugall
 Gli ordini sono ordini (1972) - Amedeo - Giorgia's husband
 The Adventures of Pinocchio (1972) - Maresciallo
 It Was Me (1973)
 Property Is No Longer a Theft (1973) - Brigadier Pirelli
 Amore mio uccidimi! (1973) - Riccardo - l'amico de Guido
 Lovers and Other Relatives (1974) - Renzo
 Brigitte, Laura, Ursula, Monica, Raquel, Litz, Florinda, Barbara, Claudia, e Sofia le chiamo tutte... anima mia (1974) - Franco Donati
 Policewoman (1974) - Ruggero Patanè
 The Perfume of the Lady in Black (1974) - Nicola
 Bello come un arcangelo (1974) - Avv. Pantaleo Fortis, 'Totonno'
 The Flower in His Mouth (1975) - Pretore Occhipinti
 La linea del fiume (1976) - Amedeo
 Evil Thoughts (1976) - lawyer Borderò
 L'Italia s'è rotta (1976) 
 Maschio latino cercasi (1977) - Gennarino (segment "Gennarino l'emigrante")
 Gangbuster (1977) - Giorgio
 Il mostro (1977) - Pisani
 Highway Racer (1977) - Silicato
 Tre soldi e la donna di classe (1977)
 Corleone (1977) - Pubblico Ministero
 Traffic Jam (1979) - Ferreri
 Tigers in Lipstick (1979) - Fioroni / The Arab (segment "L'arabo")
 Speed driver (1980)
 Help Me Dream (1981) - Guido
 Superstition (1982) - (uncredited)
 Scusa se è poco (1982) - Tullio (segment "Trenta minuti d'amore")
 La donna delle meraviglie (1985) - Ulisse
 Sicilian Connection (1987)

References

External links 
 

1933 births
1990 deaths
Italian male film actors
Male actors from Naples
Italian male television actors
Italian male stage actors
20th-century Italian male actors
Accademia Nazionale di Arte Drammatica Silvio D'Amico alumni